Clyde Turk (November 15, 1907 – April 24, 1995) was an American jockey and trainer of thoroughbred racehorses. He began riding horses in the 1920s and in 1929 was riding at the new Agua Caliente Racetrack in Tijuana, Mexico. He competed at tracks throughout  California and at the newly built Santa Anita Racetrack in Arcadia, California he rode the first-ever winner for trainer Noble Threewitt during the opening season in which he would also win important races such as the San Felipe Stakes and Santa Margarita Handicap, the latter a race he would win three more times as a trainer.

In 1946, Turk retired from riding and turned to training thoroughbreds as a career.

1967 Kentucky Derby
For owner Louis R. Rowan, Clyde Turk trained Ruken to a win in the 1967 Santa Anita Derby, the most important event for three-year-olds in California. At Churchill Downs they then won the Stepping Stone Purse which prompted bettors to make him their third choice for the Kentucky Derby in which he would finish eighth.

Clyde Turk retired from racing on March 31, 1970. He was living in Yuba City, California at the time of his death at age 87 in 1995.

References

1907 births
1995 deaths
American jockeys
American horse trainers
People from Yuba City, California